Band of Thieves may refer to:
 Band of Thieves (1928 film), a German silent film
 Band of Thieves (1962 film), a British musical film

See also
 Sly 2: Band of Thieves, a platform stealth video game